Lucie Kadlčáková (born 3 July 1982) is a Czech former ice dancer. With partner Hynek Bílek, she placed as high as 10th at the World Junior Championships and won three ISU Junior Grand Prix medals.

Programs
(with Bílek)

Competitive highlights
(with Bílek)

References

External links

Czech female ice dancers
1982 births
Living people
People from Přílepy (Kroměříž District)